Artrosis is a Polish gothic metal band founded in 1995 in Zielona Góra.

In 2001 the band was nominated for a Fryderyk, an annual award in Polish music.

Band members

Discography

Albums

Video albums

Live albums

Music videos

References

External links 

 

Polish gothic metal musical groups
Musical groups established in 1995
Mystic Production artists
Metal Mind Productions artists
Musical quartets